Panská skála, a geologic formation 80 kilometers north of Prague,  lies in the historical region of Bohemia in the Czech Republic. Panská skála is like the Giant's causeway, Ireland, or the Devil's Postpile, California. The volcanic formation is in the Central European Volcanic Province, and is thought to have been formed 30 million years ago.

References

See also
List of places with columnar jointed volcanics

Panská
Panská